Todd R. Wagner (born August 2, 1960) is an American entrepreneur, co-founder of Broadcast.com and founder and CEO of a company called Charity Network which organizes regular fund raisings. He also co-owns 2929 Entertainment with Mark Cuban, along with other entertainment companies.

Early life 
Wagner was born in Gary, Indiana. He attended Merrillville High School and then Indiana University, joining Kappa Sigma fraternity Beta Theta chapter.

He graduated from Indiana University in 1983. He earned a J.D. degree from University of Virginia and then moved to Dallas, Texas where he became a licensed CPA in the State of Texas, and began a legal career with the national firms Akin, Gump, Strauss, Hauer & Feld and Hopkins & Sutter.

Career

Broadcast.com 
In 1995, Wagner launched AudioNet with Mark Cuban, a platform for broadcasting live sporting events and radio stations over the internet. As CEO, Wagner grew the company and expanded its services to include corporate events and business services.

In 1998 Wagner and Cuban changed the name to Broadcast.com and took the company public in the midst of the dot-com boom. The Broadcast.com IPO set an opening-day record, with shares climbing 249% from an offering price of $18 to a closing price of $62.75.

In 1999, Wagner and Cuban sold Broadcast.com to Yahoo! for $5.7 billion, making 300 employees millionaires (briefly, on paper) and Wagner and Cuban instant billionaires. Wagner continued to lead the division as Yahoo! Broadcast until May 2000, when he declined an offer to become Yahoo!'s Chief Operating Officer to focus on other interests.

2929 Entertainment 
Using the success of Broadcast.com, Wagner built the Wagner/Cuban Companies including 2929 Productions. Two films the company helped produce received Oscar nominations: (Good Night, and Good Luck and Enron: The Smartest Guys in the Room). Other films include Akeelah and the Bee and The Road. Wagner is currently developing The Chosen Few, a film about the landmark Korean War battle. Good Night, directed by and co-starring George Clooney, was nominated for six Academy Awards including Best Picture.

Through 2929 Entertainment, Wagner and Mark Cuban own a group of vertically integrated entertainment properties that includes high-definition production company HDNet Films (produced the Academy Award–nominated documentary Enron: The Smartest Guys in the Room); distributor Magnolia Pictures (released Enron and Oscar-nominated Capturing the Friedmans); home video division Magnolia Home Entertainment; the Landmark Theatres art-house chain; and high-definition cable channels HDNet and HDNet Movies.

Other business ventures 
Wagner also has a stake in the Dallas Mavericks, and he continues to invest in and nurture start-ups. Additionally, Wagner and Mark Cuban were the original investors in Content Partners LLC, a company that invests in the back-end profit participations of Hollywood talent. As of 2019, Wagner remained an equity partner.

Additionally Wagner serves on the American Film Institute's Board of Trustees.

In June 2015, it was announced that Wagner had acquired the celebrity charitable fundraising platform Prizeo for an undisclosed sum.

Charity Network 
In 2014, Wagner launched Chideo, a digital platform designed to raise funds and awareness for causes by connecting fans to celebrities through exclusive video content. Over the next two years, Wagner expanded the concept through the acquisition of online sweepstakes platform Prizeo in June 2015, and online charity auction site Charitybuzz in October 2015.

In 2016, Wagner announced the formation of Charity Network, parent company to Charitybuzz, Prizeo and Chideo, with a mission to help charities transition from analog to digital. The company uses celebrities, technology and the media to raise awareness for its customers.

In February 2017, Charity Network was named one of Fast Company's 2017 Most Innovative Companies by a website called Fast Company.

See also 
 Mark Cuban

References

External links 

2929 Entertainment
Todd Wagner Foundation
Charity Network
Prizeo
Charitybuzz

People from Gary, Indiana
1960 births
Living people
Philanthropists from Indiana
2929 Entertainment holdings
20th-century American businesspeople
21st-century American businesspeople
Businesspeople from Indiana
21st-century philanthropists
Indiana University alumni
University of Virginia School of Law alumni
Yahoo! people